Increase is a male given name. It is the English language literal translation of the name Joseph, which originates from Hebrew.

Originating in England, the name was given primarily among Puritans in colonial New England and in the early 19th century in the United States. Since the 19th century, the name has decreased in popularity and is now rare, if not extinct.

Meaning and origin 
The name Increase is the English literal translation of the name Joseph, which originates from the Hebrew language. The Hebrew version of Joseph, Yosef (יוֹסֵף), translates as meaning "Yahweh will/shall increase/add," or "He will add." This name in turn originates from the Hebrew verb yasap (יסף), which means "to add, increase, or repeat." Thus, the name Increase, originated in England and was a literal translation of the Hebrew name and verb, which relates to "increase" as another child as a gift from God.

While first originating in England, the name Increase came to be used primarily by Puritans in the early colonial United States, particularly in New England.

It was written about Increase Mather (1639–1723), the Puritan minister, academic, and influential figure in the Massachusetts Bay Colony, that the reason he was given the name Increase was "... the never-to-be-forgotten increase, of every sort, wherewith God favoured the country about the time of his nativity."

Notable people 
 Increase Carpenter (1736–1807), American Revolutionary War soldier
 Increase A. Lapham (1811–1875), American writer, scientist and naturalist
 Increase Mather (1639–1723), American Puritan minister and academic, President of Harvard College
 Increase Moseley (1712–1795), American politician, Speaker of the Vermont House of Representatives
 Increase Nowell (1590–1655), English-born American colonial settler and administrator
 Increase Sumner (1746–1799), American lawyer, politician, Associate Justice of the Massachusetts Supreme Judicial Court and 5th Governor of Massachusetts
 Increase N. Tarbox (1815–1888), American writer and theologian

See also 
 Joseph

References 

English given names
English-language masculine given names
English masculine given names
Given names of Hebrew language origin
North American given names
Puritanism in the United States